Domenico Casalino (Turin, 11 January 1962) is an Italian executive. He was CEO of  Consip, a public stock company owned by the Italian Ministry of Economy and Finance operating in the public procurement services field and Techno Sky, the ENAV Group society for maintenance and development of the air traffic management technologies.

Early life 
Ever since his early youth Casalino was directly involved in social activity and in the State: first as a volunteer of the Red Cross (1977); then as an officer in the 78th Battalion "Lupi di Toscana" (1982).

After completing his studies with a degree in economics from the Sapienza University of Rome, Casalino specialized in Intelligence and Security Studies at the Link Campus – University of Malta, in Space Institutions and Policies at SIOI – Italian Society for International Organization, in Strategy and Security at the IASD, Institute for Advanced Defence Studies.

Career 
He began his professional career at the Treasury Department of the Italian Ministry of Economy and Finance, where from 1988 until 2006 joined progressively increasing responsibility and duties.

Casalino worked closely with the General Director of the Treasury Department, Professor Mario Draghi, participating in priority projects – including the modernization of the forecasting systems for the accounting of state treasury and the forecasting systems for public finance – up to become responsible for the ICT System of the same Department. Later, the collaboration of Casalino continued with Domenico Siniscalco and Vittorio Grilli.

During this period, he joined the duties of Vice President of Consip, member of the board of directors of the bank Coopercredito SpA (BNL group), member of the Monitoring Committee on compulsory liquidation of Financial Società Italiana Ernesto Breda and Reggiane OMI (both companies of the dissolved EFIM), member of the Regional Evaluation Group on health investment in the Lazio Region (as an expert in ICT systems), member of the Board for the approval of microprocessors of the Italian electronic identity card.

He also participated in GIPAF – interdisciplinary group for the administrative prevention of fraud on payment cards held by the Ministry of Economy and Finance; and became member of ACFE – Association of Certified Fraud Examiners – Italy Chapter.

From 2007 to 2011, he was in ENAV – National Society of Air Navigation Services, where he was appointed head of ICT internal systems and participates in the start-up of priority projects, including 'Single European Sky', initiative of the European Commission focused on reforming the architecture of air traffic management system to meet future capacity and safety needs.

From May 2011 to 2015, he was chief executive officer of Consip. The appointment sealed a professional career has always focused on new technologies, of which the National central purchasing – at whose creation Casalino participates from the earliest moments – is an example of Italian excellence also at international level.

From 2015 to 2017 he was chief executive officer of Techno Sky, the ENAV Group society for maintenance and development of the air traffic management technologies (software, radars and other technologies for the air traffic control).

In 2017 he was CEO of AC Group, an Italian company operating on the IoT domain for the automotive industry.

From 2017 to 2019 he was CEO of VPE, an ISO:17020 independent inspection body.

International background 
Casalino is very proactive at international level in the diffusion of know-how and methodologies related to public procurement.

In September 2012 he was invited to the 12° conference Good governance and the establishment of institutional-based states in Cairo, Egypt, as lead speaker on Good governance and public procurement.
Then he attended the launching of the MENA-OECD Network on Public Procurement, co-chaired by Consip, Tunisia and Morocco.
 
In 2013 Casalino was designated as lead procurement practitioner to the launching of the OECD Leading Practitioners meeting in OECD headquarters, together with other 20 worldwide senior procurement experts.

On February was invited speaker to the first Anti-Corruption Working Group (G20), within the framework of the Russia's G20 Presidency.

On July, Consip and PPS (Public Procurement Service), the Korean Central Purchasing Body, signed in Rome the new 'Memorandum of Understanding on Public Procurement'.

Casalino participated as lead member of the Procurement G6, the most important international network among government procurement agencies involving Italy, the USA, Republic of Korea, the UK, Canada and Chile, in the MMGP, Multilateral Meeting on Government Procurement, on September.

In the same period it was renewed the co-chairmanship of Consip of the MENA-OECD Network on Government Procurement, together with Morocco, Tunisia and the Republic of Korea, to support countries of the Arab Spring for the development of more transparent and efficient procurement systems.

In October he organized the first Italian meeting of the European Network among Central Purchasing Bodies (CPBs), involving the major CPBs of Europe.

In 2014 he was member of the Advisory Committee of the MENA-OECD Governance Programme Training Center of Caserta, together with the Ministers of Public Administration of Italy, Egypt, Jordan, Morocco and Libya.

He participates in relevant international cooperation projects – coordinated by the World Bank, and the European Commission – aimed at implementing locally advanced national procurement systems and centralized procurement models (Greece, Ethiopia, etc.).

Academic roles 
Casalino is visiting professor at LUISS University (Corporate Governance and Internal Audit) and lecturer at several universities and institutions including Sapienza University of Rome and Link Campus University, he has been:
 Member of the Scientific Committee of the GASP – Procurement in Public Sector And Healthcare, Master 2016-2017, Luiss Business School.
 Member of the Strategic Committee for the Digital Agenda, 2014-2015, Luiss Business School.
 Member of the Scientific Committee of the PPM – Public Procurement Management, International Master, University of Rome Tor Vergata, 2014.
 Member of the Advisory Board of the EMIT – Executive Master in IT Governance & Management, Luiss Business School, 2013.

Publications 
 Patrimonio culturale: un'industria in cui l'Italia può essere protagonista in Specchio Economico, 05-2016
 Spending review e buona gestione nel libero mercato, cosa ci insegna la storia? in Formiche.net, 26-04-2016
 La manutenzione 3.0 in Cleared ENAV magazine, N. 10 - 11.2015
 Cosa si può ottenere con un buon procurement pubblico in Formiche, N. 105 - 07.2015
 Introduzione in Barillari G. La Fattura Elettronica per la PA, Narcissus, 2015 
 Piccole e medie imprese tra opportunità e sfide: Consip e altri aggregatori, nuovi canali di accesso alla domanda pubblica, Quaderni Consip, 2015
 Legalità e trasparenza: la sfida vincente in Franchini C. e Sciaudone F. Il recepimento in Italia delle nuove direttive appalti e concessioni. Elementi critici e opportunità, Napoli, Editoriale scientifica, 2015, 
 Ecco come si fa cybersecurity gestionale in Formiche.net, 23.11.2014
 Come cambia il mercato elettronico della PA, per le startup  in  agendadigitale.eu , 23.6.2014
 L'aggregazione della domanda pubblica: un modello in equilibrio tra passato e futuro in AA.VV. Problematiche e prospettive nel percorso di riduzione della spesa pubblica in Italia, Roma, Il Mulino, 2014, 
 Così si attua la spending review sulla Sanità in Formiche, N. 95 - 8/9.2014
I trasporti nelle operazioni di soccorso: emergenza nell'emergenza. in PROTEC – rivista internazionale di politica, tecnologia, logistica di protezione civile ed ecologia, Roma, Publi&Consult international, Anno II, n. 10, 31 dicembre 1987, SBN 2591534
 L’importanza della cooperazione internazionale in PROTEC – rivista internazionale di politica, tecnologia, logistica di protezione civile ed ecologia, Publi & Consult international, Anno II, nn. 8-9, 15 ottobre 1987, SBN 2591534

Honours 
 5th Class / Knight Order of Merit of the Italian Republic, 2002.

 Italian Red Cross Meritorious (it: ‘Benemerito della Croce Rossa italiana’), 1990.

 
Best in Class 2012, Alumni Association of Graduates in Economics at 'Sapienza' Università di Roma.

Premio Comparto Aerospaziale 2016, Demetra Centro Studi at ENAC, 12 July 2016.

Social commitment 
He is an Officer of the Red Cross and has been a Red Cross Volunteer since 1977, participating at several international emergency operations (Sahel ‘85, operating in Niamey and Geneva) – such as in loco delegate of the International Federation of Red Cross and Red Crescent Societies – national emergency operations ('80 Irpinia earthquake, '84 L'Aquila earthquake) and CIVIS projects on cooperation between volunteers of CRI and DRK.

Casalino, also, participated to the start-up of the web identity projects of the International Red Cross.

Personal life 
Father of Valerio and Giorgia.

References

See also 
 Consip
 Italian Ministry of Economy and Finance

1962 births
Living people
Businesspeople from Turin
Sapienza University of Rome alumni
Recipients of the Order of Merit of the Italian Republic